Gerald Sedgewick Wilkinson,  (9 February 1926 – 10 March 1988) was a British illustrator, art historian, naturalist, photographer, artist and book-designer, known for his books on J. M. W. Turner's sketches and on British trees and woodlands. Though there had been many sections on the genus Ulmus in books and journals, Wilkinson's monograph, Epitaph for the Elm (1978), written for the general reader and illustrated in colour, was the first such book to be published in the UK.

Life and work
Wilkinson was born 9 February 1926 in Wigan and attended Wigan Grammar School and Manchester School of Art, where he studied lettering (a subject on which he later lectured) and took a Diploma in Art, specialising in Mural Painting (1947).<ref name="Dolman1956">Dolman, Bernard Who's Who in Art" (1956) Volume 8, p.765</ref>Gerald Sedgewick Wilkinson,  artbiogs.co.uk In the 1950s his illustrations were reproduced in Arts Council posters and in The Penrose Annual (1955). He turned to research on Turner's sketches, publishing studies in 1972, 1974, 1975 and 1981.Reviews of The Sketches of Turner, 1802–20:Review of Turner on Landscape: Karl Kroeber listed Wilkinson's Turner's Early Sketchbooks (1972) as one of the best collections of reproductions of Turner's works. Wilkinson, however, later described himself (1978) as "interested above all in landscape", an interest that led to his second reputation, as a specialist in British trees and woodlands, a subject he treated in a number of books. These included a guide to the trees of Britain, Trees in the Wild (1975), and a monograph on elms, elegiac in tone, published at the height of the Dutch elm disease pandemic, Epitaph for the Elm (1978), containing his own illustrations and photographs (one of the latter appeared on the cover of the Sunday Times Magazine, 14 May 1978). Epitaph ranged over literature, history, folklore and botany, and included chapters on the elm in art (among them paintings by John Constable) and poetry (with poems by John Clare, Edward Thomas and John Betjeman). The book was also notable for its championing of Plot elm, which Wilkinson regarded as a beautiful tree neglected by conservationists: "Unhappily," he wrote, "the plumes of Ulmus plotii are no longer a common feature of the landscape of the Trent above Newark and the Witham above Lincoln. Elms are now [1978] few in these areas that were once the home of Plot elm. A wartime shortage of wood, altered drainage levels, land clearance for power stations, and machine farming have all combined into the familiar pattern of short-term efficiency and long-term degradation." He asked readers to let him know of any surviving specimens. 

Wilkinson's region-by-region guides to British Woodland Walks were published in association with the Ordnance Survey in the 1980s. He also contributed photographs and articles to The AA Book of the Countryside (1973). The Turner books and Woodland Walks in Britain were also published in the US.

Wilkinson was elected a Fellow of the Linnean Society of London on 17 May 1977. He married the illustrator Jill Gardiner, who contributed line-drawings to his Trees in the Wild. They had two children and lived in Oxfordshire. After his death in a road accident a near Culham on 10 March 1988, the Reading Evening Post wrote, "His work as a painter was much appreciated and his paintings had been exhibited, sold and were sought after."

Publications
Art historyTurner's Early Sketchbooks: Drawings in England, Wales and Scotland from 1789 to 1802; Selected, with notes (1972)The Sketches of Turner, R.A., 1802–20: Genius of the Romantic (UK)  [Romantic Genius (US)] (1974)Turner's Colour Sketches, 1820–34 (1975)Turner on Landscape: The Liber Studiorum (1982)

Natural historyTrees in the wild, and other trees and shrubs (1975)                                    Epitaph for the Elm (1978)A History of Britain's Trees (1981)Woodland Walks in Britain (1985)Ordnance Survey Woodland Walks (1985)Ordnance Survey Woodland Walks in South East England (1986)Ordnance Survey Woodland Walks in South-West England (1986)Ordnance Survey Woodland Walks: East Central England (1986)Ordnance Survey Woodland Walks: Central England (1986)Ordnance Survey Woodland Walks in the North of England (1986)Ordnance Survey Woodland Walks: Wales and the Marches (1986)Ordnance Survey Woodland Walks: Scotland'' (1986)

References

1926 births
1988 deaths
People from Wigan
Alumni of Manchester Metropolitan University
English art historians
English naturalists
English botanists
Fellows of the Linnean Society of London
Road incident deaths in the United Kingdom